Buttsbury is a village and former  civil parish (once ancient parish) in the Chelmsford district of Essex, England, a contraction of Botulph's Pirie, a major saint who died in 680. It is sometimes surmised that the name refers to a tree under which St Botolph preached. The civil parish was merged into Stock in 1936. In 1931 the civil parish had a population of 1709.

Location
It is centred on minor roads between the towns of Ingatestone and Billericay. The parish technically starts immediately north of the old centre of Billericay and extends around the south, west and north sides of Stock. The 14th-century church of St Mary is positioned at the crossroads on a hill, which overlooks Ingatestone Hall in the distance, within Buttsbury the River Wid flows crossing the 'Buttsbury Wash

History

The village of Buttsbury and the surrounding land dates back to Saxon times, St Botolph who died in 680AD,  is said to have preached under a pear tree in the area of Buttsbury. The land was owned by a Saxon family named Bond or Bodis, the Saxon Settlement was known as Joyberd at Buttsbury. After the Norman Conquest of 1066, Buttsbury came under Norman rule and was entered in the Domesday Book of 1086 as 'Cinga'; the land was then owned by Henry De Ferrers.

The nearby church of St Mary was given to the Nunnery of St Leonard-atte-Bow in 1190.

In 1219 Buttsbury was known as Botolfvespire.

Under Norman rule in 1231 the parish of Buttsbury was referred to Ginges & Ginges Laundry in 1236, consisting of several manors, it is likely that the parish took its name from the Blunts family, who had properties in nearby Billericay, alias Ging - Joyberd - Laundry, being the largest manor in the parish, these manors embraced most of Stock & part of nearby Billericay known locally as Perry Street.

In 1295 Buttsbury was recorded as having a Watermill called Wluesdon on the river Wid, by a bridge called Wolvensbridge.

Today the village of Buttsbury consists of houses, farms and St Mary's Church, suggestions for the isolated position of the church and the disappearance of the village it served are as follows: the village was cleared to make way for sheep; the Black Death of the 14th century decimated the local population; the descendants died in the Battle of Norsey Wood in the Peasants' Revolt of 1381; there were never any dwellings near the church; and the church was built geographically to be near the junction.

The land of Buttsbury has since the early medieval period been mainly agricultural, with some remaining areas of woodland.  Of working adult men, in 1831, 84, a clear majority, worked in agriculture. The other three working sectors were: manufacturing: nil, retail and handicraft: 43 and other: 13. This remained the situation by 1881, by which time 18 of the women residents were domestic servants.

In 1848 in the Whites Directory of Essex, Buttsbury had 521 inhabitants, and consisted of 2021 acres of land, its houses were intermixed with the houses of Stock.

In the early 1870s Buttsbury had 531 residents divided across 109 houses. A wave of early 20th century building was coupled with better general health especially lower infant mortality rates. Between 1911 and 1921 the population rose from 697 to 863, notwithstanding World War I in that period. In the following ten years it rose to 1,709.

References

External links 

Villages in Essex
Former civil parishes in Essex
Stock, Essex